Gracilocyon ("gracile dog") is an extinct paraphyletic genus of placental mammals from clade Carnivoraformes, that lived in North America and Europe from late Paleocene to early Eocene.

Phylogeny
The phylogenetic relationships of genus Gracilocyon are shown in the following cladogram:

See also
 Mammal classification
 Carnivoraformes
 Miacidae

References

†
Miacids
Fossil taxa described in 2010
Fossils of Belgium
Fossils of Great Britain
Extinct mammals of North America
Prehistoric placental genera